The A1 autoroute in Martinique (officially designated as A1 (972)) is the only autoroute on the French autoroute system built outside Metropolitan France. This short autoroute, only  in length, connects Aimé Césaire International Airport in Le Lamentin to Fort-de-France.

Exits 

Unlike the Metropolitan France autoroutes, the exits along A1 are not numbered:

 : Aéroport Aimé Césaire
 : Le Lamentin-Z.I. La Lézarde, Z.I. Place d'Armes
 : La Trinité, Le Robert, Le Lamentin
 : Le Lamentin-Acajou, Z.A. Les Mangles, Centre commercial La Galleria
 : Fort-de-France-Z.A. Jambette, Quartiers Californie, Hauts de Californie
 : Fort-de-France-Pointe des Grives, Z.A.C. Rivière Roche, C.H.U. La Meynard
 : Fort-de-France-Sud, Quartier Sainte-Thérèse, Quartier Châteauboeuf, Quartier Dillon, Z.P., Gare Maritime

A01 Martinique
Transport in Martinique